Mohi-ud-Din Islamic Medical College is the first Medical College of Azad Jammu & Kashmir in either the public or the private sector.

History
Mohi-ud-Din Islamic Medical College has recently been established in Mirpur, Azad Jammu & Kashmir. The college is built with the funding and efforts of several dedicated people especially British Kashmiris benefactors. Muhammad Alauddin Siddiqui  is the founder of medical college. He is chancellor of Mohi-ud-Din Islamic University. He is also the chairman of Al-Ehya Trust, which is engaged in accommodating and educating orphaned and deprived children in Pakistan.

Accreditation
Mohi-ud-Din Islamic Medical College is recognized by the Pakistan Medical Commission formerly called Pakistan Medical and Dental Council and approved by Ministry of Health, Government of Pakistan. The PMDC has allowed the college to enroll 100 students per year.
This college is also listed on the World Directory of Medical Schools.

Controversy
FIA begins scrutiny of accounts of 100 private medical colleges.

See also
 Education in Pakistan
 Health care in Pakistan

References

Medical colleges in Azad Kashmir
Medical Colleges
Mohi-ud-Din Educational Institutes